The Waste and Emissions Trading Act 2003 (c 33) is an Act of the Parliament of the United Kingdom.

The white paper "Waste Strategy 2000: England and Wales" (Cm 4693) is a precursor of this Act.

Part 1 - Waste
This Part was intended to give effect to articles 5(1) and (2) of Council Directive 1999/31/EC (OJ L 182, 16 July 1999, page 1).

The powers conferred by sections 6 and 7 and 10 to 13 and 15 and 16 and 26 were exercised by the Landfill Allowances and Trading Scheme (England) Regulations 2004 (SI 2004/3212) and the Landfill Allowances Scheme (Northern Ireland) Regulations 2004 (SI 2004/416)

The powers conferred by sections 10 to 13 and 15 and 16 and 26 and 36 were exercised by the Landfill Allowances Scheme (Wales) Regulations 2004 (S.I. 2004/1490 (W. 155))

The powers conferred by sections 11(1) and 11(2)(b) and (d) and (f) and 11(3) and 12(1) and (4) and 24(1)(c) and 26(3) were exercised by the Landfill Allowances Scheme (Wales) (Amendment) Regulations 2011 (S.I. 2011/2555 (W. 279)

The powers conferred by sections 6 and 7 and 10 to 13 and 15 and 16 and 26 and 36 were exercised by the Landfill Allowances Scheme (Scotland) Regulations 2005 (SSI 2005/157)

The powers conferred by sections 6 and 10 to 12 and 15 and 26 were exercised by the Landfill Allowances Scheme (Amendment) Regulations (Northern Ireland) 2011 (SR 2011/373) and by Part 3 of the Waste and Emissions Trading Act 2003 (Amendment) Regulations 2011 (SI 2011/2499) to amend the Landfill Allowances and Trading Scheme (England) Regulations 2004.

Section 11 - Scheme regulations
The Landfill Allowances Scheme (Amendment) Regulations (Northern Ireland) 2009 (SR 2009/46) were made under section 11(2).

Section 26 - Penalties under Chapter 1: general
The Landfill Allowances Scheme (Amendment) Regulations (Northern Ireland) 2005 (SR 2005/208) were made under section 26(3).

The Landfill Allowances and Trading Scheme (England)(Amendment) Regulations 2005 (SI 2005/880) were made under section 26(3)(a).

Section 40 - Commencement
The following orders have been made under this section:
The Waste and Emissions Trading Act 2003 (Commencement No. 1) Order 2004 (S.I. 2004/1163 (C. 49))
The Waste and Emissions Trading Act 2003 (Commencement No. 2) Order 2004 (S.I. 2004/1874 (C. 80))
The Waste and Emissions Trading Act 2003 (Commencement No. 3) Order 2004 (S.I. 2004/3192 (C. 138))
The Waste and Emissions Trading Act 2003 (Commencement No. 1) (Great Britain) Order 2004 (S.I. 2004/3320 (C. 152))
The Waste and Emissions Trading Act 2003 (Commencement No. 1) (England and Wales) Order 2004 (S.I. 2004/3319 (C. 151))
The Waste and Emissions Trading Act 2003 (Commencement No. 1) (England) Order 2004 (S.I. 2004/3181 (C. 137))
The Waste and Emissions Trading Act 2003 (Commencement No. 2) (England) Order 2004 (S.I. 2004/3321 (C. 153))
The Waste and Emissions Trading Act 2003 (Commencement) (Wales) Order 2004 (S.I. 2004/1488 (W. 153))
The Waste and Emissions Trading Act 2003 (Commencement) (Scotland) Order 2005 (S.S.I. 2005/52 (C. 4))
The Waste and Emissions Trading Act 2003 (Commencement No. 1) Order (Northern Ireland) 2004 (S.R. 2004/399 (C. 19))

References
Halsbury's Statutes,

External links
The Waste and Emissions Trading Act 2003, as amended from the National Archives.
The Waste and Emissions Trading Act 2003, as originally enacted from the National Archives.
Explanatory notes to the Waste and Emissions Trading Act 2003.

United Kingdom Acts of Parliament 2003